Hiking trail of the Piusa River is a hiking trail in southeastern Estonia. The trail managed by RMK (State Forest Management Centre) is 15 kilometres long track past Vastseliina Castle ruins along the primeval valley of the Piusa River up to Lindora village. The trail is marked by wooden signposts and information boards that introduce the sights. There are two campfire sites on the trail supplied with barbecue grills and with the possibility of camping. There are two picnic tables with shelters and a dry toilet. The hiking trail is situated on Piusa River Valley Landscape Protection Area and among the most interesting sights on the trail are castle ruins, sandstone outcrops Härma Mäemine wall or Keldri wall (highest sandstone outcrop in Estonia), Härma alumine wall or Keldri wall and several old mill places. There are altogether 12 sandstone outcrops on the hiking trail.

References

Setomaa Parish
Hiking trails in Europe
Tourism in Estonia